Paula Fondevila Castro (born 16 May 1984) is a Spanish former tennis player.

Fondevila Castro has career-high WTA rankings of 303 in singles, achieved in July 2009, and 299 in doubles, reached in August 2009. In her career, she won one singles title and two doubles titles on the ITF Circuit.

Fondevila Castro made her WTA Tour main-draw debut at the 2009 Morocco Open. In October 2009, she played her last professional match on the ITF Circuit.

ITF finals

Singles (1–3)

Doubles (2–2)

External links
 
 

1984 births
Living people
Spanish female tennis players